Ms. Jazz is an album by American jazz vocalist Carmen McRae recorded in 1973 and released on the Groove Merchant label the following year.

Track listing
 "You Are the Sunshine of My Life" (Stevie Wonder) – 3:10	
 "You and I" (Wonder) – 4:47
 "You're Mine, You" (Johnny Green, Edward Heyman) – 3:10
 "Exactly Like You" (Jimmy McHugh, Dorothy Fields) – 3:37	
 "This Masquerade" (Leon Russell) – 3:47
 "The Good Life" (Sacha Distel, Jack Reardon) – 2:51
 "How Could I Settle for Less" (Distel, Jean Broussolle, Robert I. Allen) – 2:34
 "There'll Come a Time" (Shelton Brooks) – 4:17
 "Livin'" (Tom Garvin) – 4:29
 "Hey John" (Blossom Dearie, Jim Council) – 3:20

Personnel
Carmen McRae − vocals
Zoot Sims – tenor saxophone
Bucky Pizzarelli − guitar
Tom Garvin − piano
Paul West − bass
Jimmy Madison − drums

References

Groove Merchant albums
Carmen McRae albums
1974 albums
Albums produced by Sonny Lester